Metronet Rail was one of two infrastructure companies (the other being Tube Lines Ltd) in a public-private partnership (PPP) with London Underground. A consortium of private companies, Metronet was responsible for the maintenance, renewal, and upgrade of the infrastructure (track, trains, tunnels, signals, and stations) on nine London Underground lines from 2003 to 2008.

Following financial difficulties, the company was placed in administration in July 2007. In May 2008, the company's responsibilities were transferred back into public ownership under the authority of Transport for London (TfL). In June 2009 the National Audit Office estimated that the failure of the Metronet PPP contract cost the taxpayer up to £410million, adding that "most of the blame for Metronet's collapse lay with the consortium itself." The administration complete, the company was wound up in December 2009.

History 
In the late 1990s, the Labour government proposed a public-private partnership (PPP) to reverse years of underinvestment in London Underground. The underground trains themselves would be operated by the public sector, however the infrastructure (track, trains, tunnels, signals, and stations) would be leased to private firms for 30years to allow for improvements to be made.

Metronet was founded in 1999 as a consortium of companies to bid for PPP contracts. The equal shareholders were Atkins, Balfour Beatty, Adtranz (later Bombardier Transportation), SEEBOARD (later EDF Energy), and Thames Water.

To pay for the works, each company provided £70million of equity. A further £2billion was raised using bank loans, and £600million from the European Investment Bank. The consortium awarded contracts to its own shareholders, for example rolling stock contracts were awarded to Bombardier Transportation. This closed shop supply chain approach was later criticised for causing high costs for the consortium.

Formation of the PPP 
Following a two-year bidding process, Metronet and Tube Lines were selected as the preferred consortiums in May 2001.

In April 2003, Metronet began to maintain, upgrade and renewal London Underground infrastructure as part of the PPP. Metronet Rail had been the successful bidder for the two 30-year contracts for the following tube and sub-surface lines:
BCV (tube) lines contract: Bakerloo, Central, Victoria and Waterloo & City lines.
SSL (sub-surface) lines contract: Circle, District, East London, Hammersmith & City and Metropolitan lines.

Tube Lines, held the contract for the other London Underground linesJubilee, Northern and Piccadilly. Both Metronet and Tube Lines were colloquially referred to as "infracos". Contracts were worth around £17billion over the 30-year period, with each contract receiving around £660million each month from the Government, albeit with reductions if targets are not met.

Commitments under the PPP 
Under the terms of the PPP contracts, Metronet agreed to maintain London Underground infrastructure (track, trains, tunnels, signals, and stations) to the standards and performance levels set in the contract. Furthermore, Metronet committed to delivering substantial improvements to the network, by refurbishing, upgrading and renewing track, trains, tunnels, signals, and stations. To encourage high reliability, deductions suffered for poor performance were set at twice the rate of increase in revenue for improved performance.

At a cost of £7billion, Metronet promised substantial investment during the first 7.5years of the contract (2003 to 2010):
 147 stations (including lifts and escalators) modernised or refurbished by 2012
  of track renewed and 166 points/crossings replaced 
 Upgrade and refurbishment of tunnels, bridges, embankments, track drainage and other civil structures
 Refurbishment of existing rolling stock, as well as making them more reliable
 47 new trains with upgraded signalling on the Victoria line by 2012 (delivered as 2009 Stock)
 190 new air conditioned trains for the District, Circle, Hammersmith & City and Metropolitan lines by 2015 (delivered as S Stock)
 24 new Bakerloo line trains by 2019 (cancelled following the collapse of the PPP)

Performance and criticism 

In June 2004, the National Audit Office criticised the complexity of the PPP deals, noting they offered "the prospect, but not the certainty" of improvements. In August 2004, Metronet was declared at fault by an accident investigators' report into a May 2004 derailment at White City, for failing to implement sufficient safety checks despite being ordered to do so by TfL.

In March 2005, the House of Commons Transport Select Committee noted that "Availability is the most important factor for Tube travellers. All the infracos needed to do to meet their availability benchmarks was to perform only a little worse than in the past. On most lines, they did not even manage that." In March 2005, the House of Commons Public Accounts Committee, charged with ensuring value for money in public spending, published a report concluding that it was "impossible to determine" whether the PPP was better value than a publicly run investment programme.

In April 2005, the Commissioner of Transport for London, Bob Kiley, pressed for an urgent review of the PPP, describing its performance as "bordering on disaster". TfL also said that new technology promised by Metronet had yet to be seen — "We were supposed to be getting private sector expertise and technology with the PPP (Public Private Partnership) but instead they are just using the same old kit." A week later the chief executive of Metronet was sacked, after complaints that it had made £50million profit despite being behind on all its major works. By April 2005, it had started work on only 13 station refurbishments, instead of 32 as scheduled, and was more than a year behind on the refurbishment of 78 District line trains. It was also behind on its track replacement programme, having completed 28 km of the anticipated 48 km.

In November 2006, Metronet were heavily criticised by the arbiter of the PPP, the Office of Rail Regulation (ORR) over their performance from 2003 to 2006. Analysis included criticism that Metronet had not performed in an economic or efficient manner, and had failed to follow good industry practice. The ORR also stated that Metronet would be held responsible for £750million in cost overruns. The other PPP consortium, Tube Lines, noted that they were delivering projects on time and on budget.

In July 2007, Metronet admitted that it may have caused a Central Line train derailment near Mile End, in which a train hit a fire blanket left by maintenance workers.

Administration

In April 2007, Mayor Ken Livingstone stated that Metronet could collapse due to a £750million overspend. In July 2007 it was reported that Metronet was "teetering on the brink of administration". The situation arose because it had received only £121million out of the £551million it needed to cover cost over-runs. By contrast, Tube Lines, the other PPP consortium, had brought in almost all of its works on time and on budget. On 18 July 2007, the company was placed into administration.

To enable its business activities to be kept going while the winding-up of the company was in progress, the UK Government provided Metronet with £2billion in 2008. Following negotiations with Bombardier, Metronet modified contracts to allow for continued delivery of 2009 Stock and S Stock trains, while releasing Bombardier from its obligation to resignal the sub-surface lines.

Aftermath 
On 27 May 2008, Metronet came out of administration, and its contracts and employees were transferred to TfL under two new temporary companies, LUL Nominee BCV Ltd and LUL Nominee SSL Ltd. On 3 December 2009, the PPP business of Metronet Rail became an integral part of London Underground. Some of the improvements promised by Metronet were delivered (such as new 2009 Stock and S Stock trains), however other improvements were cancelled or delayed.

In 2008, the Department for Transport refuted claims that the PPP was to blame for the collapse of Metronet, and that it was "predominantly a corporate failure", with "structural weaknesses [that] led to its own downfall." In 2010 the House of Commons' Public Accounts Committee reprimanded the Department for Transport for its failure to heed National Audit Office warnings about the company's management. According to the report from the Public Accounts Committee, around £170million to £410m of taxpayer money was lost due to the failure of Metronet. The companies involved in the consortium collectively lost around £350million in the collapse.

In May 2010, it was announced that TfL would buy out the Tube Lines consortium, formally ending the PPP. By the beginning of 2011, with the formal liquidation process having been completed, the Metronet brand and group of companies had ceased to exist.

See also 

 History of the London Underground

References

External links

CityMayors article
Bloomberg.com

London Underground infrastructure
Public–private partnership projects in the United Kingdom